Ferenc Krucsó (born 8 September 1951) is a Hungarian equestrian. He competed in two events at the 1980 Summer Olympics.

References

External links
 

1951 births
Living people
Hungarian male equestrians
Olympic equestrians of Hungary
Equestrians at the 1980 Summer Olympics
Sportspeople from Békés County